Gerardus "Gerrit" Petrus Voorting (18 January 1923 – 30 January 2015) was a Dutch road cyclist who was active between 1947 and 1960. As an amateur he won the silver medal in the individual road race at the 1948 Summer Olympics in London. In his professional career Voorting won two Tour de France stages and wore the yellow jersey for 4 days. Voorting died on 30 January 2015 in his home in Heemskerk at the age of 92, within a week of two other members of the Dutch men's team pursuit squad, Henk Faanhof and Joop Harmans. He was the elder brother of Olympic cyclist Adrie Voorting.

Major results

1948
Silver medal individual road race Olympic Games
1952
Den Bosch
6th stage Ronde van Nederland
Terneuzen
1953
Machelen
1953 Tour de France:
Winner 4th stage
1954
Acht van Chaam
Vlissingen
1955
Maastricht
Zandvoort
1956
Kampen
 National Championship, Track, 50 km
Oostende
Tour de France:
Wearing yellow jersey for one day
1957
Made
Ronde van Nederland:
Winner stage 7 and 8
Roosendaal
1958
Grote 1-Mei Prijs
Lummen
Ninove
Ronde van Nederland:
Winner 2nd stage
Tour de France:
Winner 2nd stage
Wearing yellow jersey for three days
1959
Made
Ninove
Roosendaal

See also
List of Dutch Olympic cyclists
List of Dutch cyclists who have led the Tour de France general classification

References

External links

1923 births
2015 deaths
Dutch male cyclists
Cyclists at the 1948 Summer Olympics
Olympic cyclists of the Netherlands
Olympic silver medalists for the Netherlands
People from Velsen
Dutch Tour de France stage winners
Olympic medalists in cycling
Medalists at the 1948 Summer Olympics
Cyclists from North Holland
Dutch track cyclists
20th-century Dutch people
21st-century Dutch people